Allen Francis Gardiner (1794–1851) was a British Royal Navy officer and missionary to Patagonia.

Biography
Gardiner was the fifth son of Samuel Gardiner of Coombe Lodge, Oxfordshire, by Mary, daughter of Charles Boddam of Capel House, Bull's Cross, Enfield, Middlesex. He was born on 28 January 1794 in the parsonage house at Basildon, Berkshire, where his parents were temporarily residing. He was religiously educated, and in May 1808 entered the Royal Naval College, Portsmouth.

Naval career
On 20 June 1810 he went to sea as a volunteer on board . He distinguished himself in the capture of the American frigate , and was sent to England as acting lieutenant of that prize.

He returned invalided to Portsmouth on 31 October 1822.

He was promoted to commander on 13 September 1826. After that, although he often applied for positions in the Royal Navy, he never succeeded in obtaining another appointment.

Marriage and family
On 1 July 1823, Gardiner married Julia Susanna, second daughter of John Reade and his wife of Ipsden House, Ipsden, Oxfordshire. They had several children together including one son, Allen W. Gardiner. Not all his daughters survived to adulthood. Julia Gardiner died in the Isle of Wight on 23 May 1834.

About two years later, Gardiner married secondly, on 7 October 1836, Elizabeth Lydia, eldest daughter of the Rev. Edward Garrard Marsh, vicar of Aylesford, Kent.

Missionary work
Long interested in the missionary work being done in non-Christian populations, after the death of one of his daughters, he decided to enter that field. With this view Gardiner went to Africa in 1834. Exploring the Zulu country, he started the first missionary station at Port Natal in present-day South Africa. From 1834 to 1838, he worked to plant Christian churches in Zululand, but political events and native wars combined to prevent any permanent success. He founded a mission at Hambanathi on near the Tongaat river.

From 1838 to 1843, Gardiner laboured among the indigenous peoples of Chile, and went from island to island in the Indian Archipelago (now called Tierra del Fuego). His efforts were foiled by the opposition of the various governments.

Gardiner's first visit to Tierra del Fuego took place 22 March 1842, when, coming from the Falkland Islands in the schooner Montgomery, he landed in Oazy harbour. He appealed to the Church Missionary Society to send missionaries to Patagonia, but was declined for lack of funds to support such a distant endeavour. Similarly, he appealed to the Wesleyan and London Missionary societies.

In 1844 a special society was formed for South America, which took the name of the Patagonian Missionary Society. Robert Hunt, a schoolmaster, was sent out as the first missionary and accompanied by Gardiner. They were unable to establish a mission and returned to England in June 1845. Gardiner departed England again 23 September 1845, and, in company with Federico Gonzales, a Spanish Protestant, from whom he learnt Spanish, went to Bolivia. They distributed Bibles to the Indian population, but were strongly opposed by the Roman Catholics, who were the predominant Christian group in the country.

He established Gonzales as a missionary at Potosi, and returned to England, landing at Southampton on 8 February 1847. The next year he sailed to Tierra del Fuego, where he surveyed the islands with a view to a mission, and suffered great hardships. He tried to interest the Moravian Brethren and the Foreign Missions of the Church of Scotland in this enterprise, but neither could render any aid. He proposed that a mission should be established on a substantial ship, rather than trying to set up one on land. At last, a lady at Cheltenham having given £700, the mission was determined on.

Accompanied by Richard Williams, surgeon; Joseph Erwin, ship-carpenter; John Maidment, catechist; and three Cornish fishermen, Pearce, Badcock, and Bryant, Gardiner sailed from Liverpool on 7 September 1850 in Ocean Queen. The party landed at Picton Island on 5 December. The Yahgan people were hostile, the climate severe, and the country barren. The party were also hindered by failures such as the devastating realisation that they had left nearly all their shot on the ship, leaving them unable to hunt for fresh food. Six months elapsed without the arrival of additional supplies, which were detained at the Falkland Islands for want of a vessel. After relocating to Spaniard Harbour on the southeast coast of the main island, the unfortunate men gradually died of starvation. Gardiner, the last survivor, is believed to have died on 6 September 1851.

On 21 October the vessel John Davison arrived to resupply the group, and found all the men dead. On 6 January 1852  visited the place, but all the sailors could do was to bury the bodies and bring away Gardiner's journal. Two years later in 1854, an 88-ton schooner named for him, was sent out to Patagonia as a British missionary ship. In 1856 Allen W. Gardiner, the captain's only son, went to that country as a missionary.

Commemoration
An islet in the Chilean group of islands which includes Picton island remains named after Gardiner. The street in Durban named in his honour, was later renamed Dorothy Nyembe Street, to honour a South African activist and as part of the city's renaming process.

Allen Gardiner is remembered in the Church of England with a commemoration on 6 September.

Publications
His works include:

 with Thomas J. Maslin

See also

Port Famine

Notes and references

Further reading
 Bridges, E L (1948) The Uttermost Part of the Earth Republished 2008, Overlook Press

External links
Captain Allen Francis Gardiner papers at the Killie Campbell Museum

1794 births
1851 deaths
Evangelical Anglicans
People from Basildon, Berkshire
Royal Navy officers
Royal Navy personnel of the War of 1812
English Anglican missionaries
English evangelicals
Anglican missionaries in Argentina
Deaths by starvation
Anglican missionaries in Chile
Anglican mission in Tierra del Fuego
Anglican missionaries in South Africa
British expatriates in Chile
English expatriates in Argentina
Anglican saints